Sir George Morley  (17 November 1873 – 13 October 1942) was a British police officer.

Morley was born in Bradford, the son of William James Morley and Anne Brook, and educated at Worcester College, Oxford. He originally intended to become a barrister, but instead joined the Royal Irish Constabulary as a cadet. He rose to the rank of District Inspector and in 1910 was appointed Chief Constable of Hull City Police. 

In 1922, he was appointed Chief Constable of Durham County Constabulary and remained in post until his death at the age of 68 following an operation. Since 1939, he had also been county organiser of Air Raid Precautions services for County Durham.

Morley was appointed Commander of the Order of the British Empire (CBE) in the 1920 civilian war honours and was knighted in 1937.

Footnotes

1873 births
1942 deaths
People from Bradford
Alumni of Worcester College, Oxford
Royal Irish Constabulary officers
British Chief Constables
Knights Bachelor
Commanders of the Order of the British Empire
English recipients of the Queen's Police Medal
Civil Defence Service personnel